Olga Sergaeva is a retired Russian football defender, last played for Zorky Krasnogorsk in the Russian Championship. She previously played for Lada Togliatti, Ryazan VDV, Rossiyanka and Zvezda Perm, winning 7 championships with the three latter.

She has been a member of the Russian national team, and took part in the 2003 World Cup.

Titles
 7 Russian Leagues (1999, 2005, 2006, 2007, 2008, 2009, 2010)
 6 Russian Cups (1998, 2002, 2005, 2006, 2007, 2010)

References

1975 births
Living people
Russian women's footballers
Russia women's international footballers
2003 FIFA Women's World Cup players
FC Lada Togliatti (women) players
FC Zorky Krasnogorsk (women) players
Ryazan-VDV players
Zvezda 2005 Perm players
Sportspeople from Tolyatti
Women's association football midfielders
Women's association football defenders
WFC Rossiyanka players
Russian Women's Football Championship players